Neal and Jack and Me is a live DVD by the British progressive rock band King Crimson, released in 2004. It is a compilation of two vintage concerts by the band in the 1980s, namely, The Noise: Frejus and Three of a Perfect Pair: Live in Japan. Both concert videos were originally released on Betamax and VHS.

Track listing

Three of a Perfect Pair – Live in Japan 1984 (Reissue)
"Three of a Perfect Pair"
"No Warning"
"Larks' Tongues in Aspic Part III"
"Thela Hun Ginjeet"
"Frame by Frame"
"Matte Kudasai"
"Industry"
"Dig Me"
"Indiscipline"
"Satori in Tangier"
"Man with an Open Heart"
"Waiting Man"
"Sleepless"
"Larks' Tongues in Aspic Part II"
"Elephant Talk"
"Heartbeat"

The Noise – Live in Frejus 1982
"Waiting Man"
"Matte Kudasai"
"The Sheltering Sky"
"Neal and Jack and Me"
"Indiscipline"
"Heartbeat"
"Larks' Tongues in Aspic Part II"

Extras
"Sleepless" *Music Video
"Tony's Road Photos"
"Discography"

Three of a Perfect Pair – Live in Japan 1984 (Original Issue)
"No Warning"
"Larks' Tongues in Aspic Part III"
"Thela Hun Ginjeet"
"Frame By Frame"
"Matte Kudasai"
"Industry"
"Dig Me"
"Three of a Perfect Pair"
"Indiscipline"
"Sartori In Tangier"
"Man with an Open Heart"
"Waiting Man"
"Sleepless"
"Larks' Tongues in Aspic Part II"
"Discipline"
"Elephant Talk
"Heartbeat

Extra features
Sleepless videoclip – Tony's Road Photos in tour – Discography

Personnel
Adrian Belew – guitar and vocals, drums on "Indiscipline" and "Waiting Man" (Live in Japan 1984)
Robert Fripp – guitar
Tony Levin – Chapman Stick, bass guitar
Bill Bruford – drums, percussion

References

King Crimson video albums
2004 video albums